Ian Gregory Bishop (born 13 November 1962 in Devizes, Wiltshire) is the current Archdeacon of Macclesfield.

Ian Bishop was educated at Devizes School and Portsmouth Polytechnic. He was ordained in 1992 and served as a curate at Christ Church, Purley. Later he was Rector of St Michael and All Angels, Middlewich and then St John the Evangelist's Church, Byley before his appointment to the Diocese of Chester's senior leadership team.

He is a director of the Simeon Trustees, a trust established in the nineteenth century by Charles Simeon to purchase advowsons for Anglican ministers aligned with the Evangelical Anglicanism.

References

1962 births
People from Devizes
People educated at Devizes School
Alumni of the University of Portsmouth
Archdeacons of Macclesfield
Living people